Greatest Hits Vol. II is the thirteenth album released by singer-songwriter Barry Manilow. In Britain, Manilow's first Greatest Hits album had been issued as Manilow Magic, thus this second volume was issued there as A Touch More Magic.

The album was mostly compilation, with the exception of three new tracks: "You're Looking Hot Tonight", "Put a Quarter in the Jukebox" and "Read 'Em and Weep" (#18 U.S., his last Top 40 on the Hot 100 to date, and also a cover of the Meat Loaf hit of the same name, albeit with an altered second verse and instrumental arrangement). The album reached platinum sales in 1993.

Track listing

Charts

Certifications

References

1983 greatest hits albums
Barry Manilow compilation albums
Arista Records compilation albums
Albums produced by Ron Dante